Gerd Schwidrowski (born 19 September 1947 in Rendsburg) is a former professional German footballer.

Schwidrowski made a total of 9 appearances in the Fußball-Bundesliga for Tennis Borussia Berlin during his playing career.

References 
 

1947 births
Living people
People from Rendsburg
German footballers
Association football midfielders
Bundesliga players
2. Bundesliga players
MSV Duisburg players
Tennis Borussia Berlin players
Footballers from Schleswig-Holstein